Joey Meng Yee-man born 2 October 1970 is a Hong Kong actress, model and beauty spokesperson. She is best known for her roles with television network ATV before moving to network TVB in 2013. Her contract with TVB ended in 2020.

Life and career
After middle-school, Meng participated in the 1989 Miss Asia Pageant and emerged as first runner-up. She joined Hong Kong television station ATV on a contract that year. Meng is best known for her role as "Ma Siu-ling" in the My Date with a Vampire television series trilogy. In August 2000, she married Chan Sap-sam (the screenwriter of the My Date with a Vampire trilogy) in Las Vegas, the United States after dating for about four months.

By 2012, after over twenty years working with ATV, Meng didn't renew her contract and transferred over to ATV's competitor, TVB.

Her first television drama was Inbound Troubles, which is 2013's highest-rated television drama for the first half of the year. By February 2015, Meng completed her contract with TVB and decided not to renew for some personal time away. Due to deteriorating health, she decided to work with TVB on a per-series basis to give herself the time and freedom to choose between projects and balance personal life. She returned for one final series with TVB, 2021's Shadow of Justice, which was filmed in 2019. She officially left the network in 2020 and has resided in mainland China with her husband since her departure.

Personal life 
Meng is married to Robert Chan who is the creator of My Date With A Vampire.

Filmography

Films

Television dramas

References

External links

Hong Kong Cinemagic

1970 births
Living people
20th-century Hong Kong actresses
21st-century Hong Kong actresses
Hong Kong film actresses
Hong Kong television actresses